Marios Athanasiadis (born 31 October 1986) is a Cypriot cross-country mountain biker. At the 2012 Summer Olympics, he competed in the Men's cross-country at Hadleigh Farm, finishing in 40th place, the last rider to finish without being lapped.  At the 2014 Commonwealth Games he finished in 16th place in the men's cross-country.

He took up cycling at the age of 12, introduced to it by the man who would become his coach.  His gold medal at the 2009 Games of the Small States of Europe was Cyprus's first in mountain biking.  He was also the Cypriot Youth Ambassador at 2010 Youth Olympic Games.

Major results

MTB

2003
 1st  National Junior XCO Championships
2004
 1st  National XCO Championships
2005
 2nd National XCO Championships
 3rd  Cross-country, Games of the Small States of Europe
2006
 1st  National XCO Championships
2007
 2nd National XCO Championships
2008
 1st  National XCO Championships
 2nd  Balkan Under-23 XCO Championships
 3rd  Balkan XCO Championships
2009
 1st  Cross-country, Games of the Small States of Europe
2010
 1st  National XCO Championships
2011
 2nd  Cross-country, Games of the Small States of Europe
2013
 2nd  Cross-country, Games of the Small States of Europe

Road

2008
 3rd Time trial, National Road Championships
2009
 National Road Championships
2nd Road race
2nd Time trial
2010
 2nd Road race, National Road Championships
2011
 National Road Championships
1st  Time trial
3rd Road race
2012
 National Road Championships
1st  Time trial
2nd Road race
2013
 National Road Championships
1st  Road race
1st  Time trial
2014
 National Road Championships
2nd Road race
3rd Time trial

References

Cypriot male cyclists
Cross-country mountain bikers
Living people
Olympic cyclists of Cyprus
Cyclists at the 2012 Summer Olympics

1986 births
Sportspeople from Nicosia
Commonwealth Games competitors for Cyprus
Cyclists at the 2014 Commonwealth Games